Alip is a surname. Notable people with the surname include:

Jaime Aristotle Alip (born 1957), Filipino social entrepreneur
Nuraly Alip (born 1999), Kazakh footballer

See also
Alie